The Grand 10 Berlin is an annual road running event over ten kilometres which is held in October in Berlin, Germany. It is officially known as the ASICS Grand 10 Berlin due to its sponsorship by the sportswear manufacturer. First held in 2008, the competition is organised by the Berlin Läuft (Berlin Runs) group which also holds the annual Big 25 Berlin race over 25 km.

The race attracts elite level and fun runner participants. There are three distinct competition types at the event: a full 10 km elite and mass race, a 2×5 km road relay for partners and families, and an 800 metres race for children. There were almost 6,500 participants in the Grand 10 Berlin event in 2009.

The race starts and finishes at Charlottenburg Palace in the Charlottenburg district of Berlin. At the beginning of the race, the course goes past Spandauer Damm, onto Otto-Suhr-Allee, then into Ernst-Reuter-Platz. It reaches Straße des 17. Juni then heads south at the Berlin Victory Column. After looping through the Berlin Zoological Garden, the course passes through Budapester Straße, Kantstraße, and then Schloßstraße which leads to the finishing point near Charlottenburg Palace.

Leonard Patrick Komon's course record of 27:12 minutes, set in 2010, is the fastest ever time over the distance in a German competition. Joyce Chepkirui holds the women's race record with her run of 30:37 minutes in 2013.

Past winners
Key:

References

External links
Official website

10K runs
Sports competitions in Berlin
Athletics competitions in Germany
Recurring sporting events established in 2008